Savvy Show Stoppers is a compilation album by Shadowy Men on a Shadowy Planet, released in 1988 through Glass Records.

Track listing

Personnel 
Shadowy Men on a Shadowy Planet
Brian Connelly – guitar, keyboards
Reid Diamond – bass guitar
Don Pyle – drums
Production and additional personnel
Shadowy Men on a Shadowy Planet – production
Coyote Shivers – production

References

External links 
 

1988 compilation albums
Shadowy Men on a Shadowy Planet albums